Adath Jeshurun ( "Congregation/Community of the Upright") may refer to the following Jewish synagogues:

Congregation Adath Jeshurun, Boston, Massachusetts
Adath Jeshurun Congregation, Minnetonka, Minnesota
Kahal Adath Jeshurun (commonly known as the Eldridge Street Synagogue), Chinatown, Manhattan, New York
Adath Jeshurun of Jassy Synagogue, Lower East Side, Manhattan, New York
Khal Adath Jeshurun, Washington Heights, Manhattan, New York
 Adath Yeshurun congregation of Aiken, South Carolina

See also
 Jeshurun